Thorngate is an inner northern suburb of Adelaide, South Australia. It is located in the City of Prospect.

This small suburb is one of South Australia's most expensive. Although sales are rare, houses on Fitzroy Terrace and Churcher Street were valued well over $1 million in 2006.

History
Formerly part of Fitzroy, the suburb is thought to be named after the original grantee of that area, one John Batty Thorngate. Arriving from Gosport, Hampshire, Thorngate was granted his land in 1840.

Geography
Thorngate is one of Adelaide's smallest suburbs. It is bounded to the north by Carter Street, to the south by Fitzroy Terrace, in the west by Prospect Road and the east by Main North Road. The only other streets in the suburb are Churcher Street and Thorngate Street.

Demographics

The 2006 Census by the Australian Bureau of Statistics counted 180 persons in Thorngate on census night. Of these, half were female.

The majority of residents (76.7%) are of Australian birth, with an additional 6.7% identifying Greece as their country of birth.

The age distribution of Thorngate residents is similar to that of the greater Australian population. 64.4% of residents were over 25 years in 2006, compared to the Australian average of 66.5%; and 35.6% were younger than 25 years, compared to the Australian average of 33.5%.

Politics
Thorngate is in the South Australian House of Assembly electoral district of Adelaide and the Australian House of Representatives division of Adelaide.

Facilities and attractions
A BP service station sits on the corner of Carter Street and Main North Road.

Transportation

Roads
Thorngate is serviced by Main North Road and Prospect Road, which link the suburb to both Adelaide city centre and the northern suburbs.

Public transport

Buses
The suburb is serviced by the following bus routes:
G10
221, 222
224, 226F, N224
225
228
229
209F

See also
List of Adelaide suburbs

References

External links

Suburbs of Adelaide